Rurie Morgan (30 July 1912 – 4 January 1980) was a New Zealand cricketer. He played in eleven first-class matches for Wellington from 1932 to 1931.

See also
 List of Wellington representative cricketers

References

External links
 

1912 births
1980 deaths
New Zealand cricketers
Wellington cricketers
Cricketers from Wellington City
New Zealand Services cricketers